Hisle is an unincorporated community in Jackson County, in the U.S. state of South Dakota.

History
A post office called Hisle was established in 1923, and remained in operation until 1971. The name Hisle was coined by shortening and altering the name of local pioneer William Highshield.

References

Unincorporated communities in Jackson County, South Dakota
Unincorporated communities in South Dakota